Miss Universe 1990, the 39th Miss Universe pageant, held on April 15, 1990 at the Shubert Theatre in Los Angeles, California, United States.

Mona Grudt of Norway was crowned by her predecessor Angela Visser of Holland at the end of the event. Seventy one contestants competed for the title.

Results

Placements

Final Competition

Special awards

Contestants 

  – Paola de la Torre
  – Gwendolyne Kwidama
  – Charmaine Ware
  – Sandra Luttenberger
  – Lisa Nichelle Sawyer
  – Ysela Antonia Zabaneh
  – Janet Tucker
  – Rosario del Pilar Rico Toro
  – Jestina Hodge
  – Robin Lee Ouzunoff
  – Tricia Rose Whittaker
  – Uranía Haltenhoff
  – Lizeth Mahecha
  – Julieta Posla
  – Jana Hronkova
  – Maj-Britt Jensen
  – Rosario Rodríguez
  – Jessica Núñez
  – Dalia El Behery
  – Gracia María Guerra
  – Carla Barrow
  - Tiina Susanna Vierto
  – Gaëlle Voiry †
  – Christiane Stocker
  – Audrey Gingell
  – Jeni Balatsinou
  – Sascha Nukaka Motzfeldt
  – Marcia Damian
  – Marianela Abate
  – Stephanie Halenbeek
  – Vivian Moreno
  – Monica Chan
  – Hildur Dungalsdóttir
  – Suzanne Sablok
  – Barbara Ann Curran
  – Yvonna Krugliak
  – Annamaria Malipiero
  – Michelle Hall
  – Hiroko Miyoshi
  – Anna Lin Lim
  – Charmaine Farrugia
  – Anita Ramgutty
  – Marilé del Rosario Santiago
  – Sabina Umeh
  – Edwina Menzies
  – Mona Grudt
  – Mónica Plate
  – Marisol Martínez
  – Germelina Leah Banal Padilla
  – Małgorzata Obieżalska
  – Maria Rosado
  – María Luisa Fortuño
  – Wen Tzui Pin
  – Glenor Browne
  – Karina Ferguson
  – Ong Lay Ling
  – Oh Hyun-kyung
  - Evia Stalbovska
  – Raquel Revuelta
  – Roshani Aluwinare
  – Saskia Sibilo
  – Linda Isaksson
  – Catherine Mesot
  – Passaraporn Chaimongkol
  – Maryse de Gourville
  – Jülide Ateş
  – Karen Been
  – Ondina Pérez
  – Carole Gist
  – Andreína Goetz
  – Jane Lloyd

Order of Introduction
This year followed the pageant in the year before that the Parade of Nations segment was presented by introducing the delegates, designated in the regional groups. However, the delegates were also talking about their plans for the future and telling their names.

Notes

Debuts 
 - Evia Staļbovska was one of the 17 semi-finalists in the 1989 Miss USSR pageant.

Returns 
Last competed in 1970:

Withdrawals 
 -  Katia Alens had completed Miss International 1990 and Miss World 1990. Miss Belgium Organization did not send at representative this year. Katia Alens later participated in Miss Universe 1991.
 - Due the franchise owner withdrawal, no national contest held.

 - Beata Jarzynska

Crossovers 
Contestants who previously competed or will compete at other beauty pageants:

Miss World
1989:  – Jana Hronkova
1989:  – Audrey Gingell
1989:  - Barbara Ann Curran
1989:  - Maria Rosado (top 10)
1989:  - Catherine Mesot
1990:  - Gwendolyne Charlotte Kwidama (top 10)
1990:  – Ysela Antonia Zabaneh
1990:  – Dalia El Behery
1990:  - Gaëlle Voiry 
1990:  – Christiane Stocker
1990:  - Sabina Ifeoma Umeh
1990:  - Jülide Ateş (top 10)
Miss International
1987:  - Barbara Ann Curran
1990:  – Sandra Luttenberger
1990:  – Marianela Abate
1990:  – Edwina Menzies
1990:  - Jane Lloyd (as )

Miss Europe
1991:  – Sandra Luttenberger
1991:  - Gaëlle Voiry 
1991:  – Karina Ferguson
1991:  - Catherine Mesot
1991:  – Jane Lloyd

Miss Chinese International Pageant
1989:   – Monica Chan (1st runner-up)

Queen of the World
1989:  - Germelina Padilla
1990:  - Rosario Rico Toro (2nd runner-up)

Miss All Nations
1990:  – Sandra Luttenberger (top 10)
1990:  – Ysela Antonia Zabaneh
1990:  – Mónica Plate Cano
1990:  – Gracia María Guerra
1990:  – Ondina Pérez

Miss Hispanidad International
1990:  – Rosario Rodríguez (Winner)
1990:  – Ondina Pérez

Miss Scandinavia 
1990:  – Hildur Dungalsdóttir
1991:  - Tiina Susanna Vierto (1st runner-up)

Reinado Internacional del Café
1990:  – Julieta Posla (1st runner-up'')
1990:  – Vivian Audely Moreno

General references

References

External links 
 Miss Universe official website

1990
1990 beauty pageants
Beauty pageants in the United States
1990 in California
Events in Los Angeles
April 1990 events in the United States